Under U.S. Federal law, 26 USC 102(c) governs the income tax treatment, by an employee, of gifts received by an employee from his or her employer. While gifts are typically exempt from gross income under U.S. federal income tax law, this is not usually so for gifts received from employers. Under Internal Revenue Code section 102(c), gifts transferred by or for an employer to, or for the benefit of, an employee, cannot generally be excluded from gross income.

There are some statutory exceptions to this rule, for example, in the case of de minimis fringe amounts and for achievement awards.

See also
Income tax in the United States.
Gift tax

External links 
 The Taxation of a Gift or Inheritance from an Employer, Douglas A. Kahn, University of Michigan Law School
 26 USC section 132 Certain Fringe Benefits
 26 USC section 74 Prizes and Awards

References

102c
United States federal income tax